Il Capitano: A Swedish Requiem is a 1991 Swedish-Finnish biographical drama film directed by Jan Troell about the 1988 Åmsele murders in which a family of three was murdered by Juha Valjakkala over a stolen bicycle.

Antti Reini stars as Valjakkala, renamed Jari in the film, and Maria Heiskanen as his girlfriend Marita Routalammi, renamed Minna. Being released so soon after the actual event, the film was very controversial and received highly-mixed reviews, with some critics praising it for the difficult choice of subject and others condemning it for the same reason.

Cast
 Antti Reini as Jari
 Maria Heiskanen as Minna
 Berto Marklund as Police
 Antti Vierikko as Jari age 13
 Harri Mallenius as Teacher
 Marjut Dahlström as Teacher
 Eva Stellby as Post-Mortem Dissector
 Matti Dahlberg as Father
 Christina Frambäck as Priest

Awards and nominations
 Amanda Awards
 Best Foreign Feature Film (Troell, won)
 42nd Berlin International Film Festival
 Best Director (Troell, won)
 Golden Bear (Troell, nominated)
 Chicago International Film Festival
 Best Actress (Heiskanen, won)
 27th Guldbagge Awards
 Best Film (won)
 Best Actor (Reini, nominated)
 Best Cinematography (Troell, nominated)
 Best Screenplay (Enquist, nominated)

References

External links
 
 

1991 films
1990s Finnish-language films
1990s Swedish-language films
Films directed by Jan Troell
Best Film Guldbagge Award winners
Swedish biographical drama films
Finnish biographical drama films
1990s biographical drama films
1991 drama films
1991 multilingual films
Swedish multilingual films
Finnish multilingual films
1990s Swedish films